Zinc finger protein 264 is a protein that in humans is encoded by the ZNF264 gene.

References

Further reading